Dale Radomski is a Hawaiian stuntman and once-actor.  He has performed stunts in several television shows and mainstream films including Hawaiian Heat, Jake and the Fatman, America's Most Wanted, War and Remembrance, Goodbye Paradise, Fists of Steel, Raven, Picture Bride, Marker, Race the Sun, Escape from Atlantis, the 1998 version of Fantasy Island, Pearl Harbor, Blood of the Samurai - The Series, and Hawaii.  Radomski also portrayed the part of "Tourniquet Man" in the pilot episode of Lost.

References

External links

American male television actors
American stunt performers
Living people
Year of birth missing (living people)